Marengo is a former unincorporated community in Hayes County, Nebraska, United States.

History
Marengo had a post office between 1891 and 1934.

The town was founded by French explorer Felix de Trogoff in 1889.

References

Populated places in Hayes County, Nebraska
Unincorporated communities in Nebraska